The Beaver River is a river of Minnesota.  The river flows through the southwest part of Morse Township in northern Saint Louis County.  It is a tributary of the Bear Island River.

See also
List of rivers of Minnesota

References

Minnesota Watersheds
USGS Hydrologic Unit Map - State of Minnesota (1974)

Rivers of Minnesota
Rivers of St. Louis County, Minnesota